Dasarahalli is a town and a city municipal council in Bangalore Rural district in the state of Karnataka, India.

Dasarahalli may also refer to:
 Dasarahalli metro station, a metro station on the Green Line of the Namma Metro, Bangalore, India
 Dasarahalli, an administrative zone of Bruhat Bengaluru Mahanagara Palike of the Greater Bangalore metropolitan area
 Dasarahalli (Vidhana Sabha constituency), a constituency of the Karnataka Legislative Assembly